Sunil Kanti Roy (8 January 1944 – 8 May 2022), better known as S. K. Roy, was an Indian entrepreneur, business person and the managing director of Peerless Group, a Kolkata-based conglomerate, which has interests in finance, healthcare, insurance, automobiles and securities. An alumnus of the City College, Kolkata, he took over the responsibilities from his elder brother, B. K. Roy, after his death, as the managing director of the Group in 1985. He is one among the high-net-worth individuals from West Bengal.

Biography
Born on 8 January 1944 in Calcutta to Radhashyam Roy, the founder of the residuary non-banking company (RNBC), Peerless Group, Roy served as the Managing Director of The Peerless General Finance and Investment Company and chaired the Peerless Developers Limited, Peerless Hotels Limited, Kaizen Hotels and Resorts Limited. He also sat on the board of directors of Peerless Hospitex Hospital and Research Centre Limited, Bengal Peerless Housing Development Limited, Peerless Securities Limited and Peerless Financial Services Limited and has served as a member of the director board of West Bengal Industrial Development Corporation. He was an incumbent member of the Federation of Indian Chambers of Commerce & Industry (FICCI) as well as the Bengal Chamber of Commerce and Industry (BCCI) at their executive committees. The Government of India awarded him the fourth highest civilian honour of the Padma Shri, in 2009, for his contributions to society.

Roy died in Kolkata on 8 May 2022, at the age of 78.

See also 
 Peerless Group
 City College, Kolkata

References 

1944 births
2022 deaths
Recipients of the Padma Shri in social work
Businesspeople from Kolkata
Indian chief executives
City College, Kolkata alumni
University of Calcutta alumni